The year 1554 CE in science and technology included a number of events, some of which are listed here.

Astronomy
 Flemish astronomer Johannes Stadius' first published work, Ephemerides novae at auctae, appears in Cologne

Biology
 Bolognese naturalist Ulisse Aldrovandi creates a herbarium.
 Flemish herbalist Rembert Dodoens publishes his herbal Cruydt-Boeck in Antwerp.
 The guinea pig is first described in the West by Swiss naturalist Conrad Gessner.
 French physician Guillaume Rondelet begins publication of Libri de piscibus marinis in Lyon, a standard work on marine zoology.
 Hippolito Salviani begins publication of Aquatilium animalium historiae in Rome, a foundation of modern ichthyology.
 French anatomist Charles Estienne publishes a collection of tracts on agriculture, Praedium Rusticum.

Exploration
 November – English captain John Lok voyages to Guinea.
 French Franciscan voyager André Thévet publishes his account of an embassy to Constantinople in Cosmographie de Levant (Lyon).

Metallurgy
 Spanish merchant Bartolomé de Medina  introduces the patio process, using mercury amalgamation to extract silver from ore, in Pachuca, New Spain (Mexico).

Physics
 Venetian mathematician Giambattista Benedetti publishes two editions of Demonstratio proportionum motuum localium, developing his new doctrine of the speed of bodies in free fall.

Technology
 Completion of the Church of Sant'Andrea in Via Flaminia, Rome, designed by Giacomo Barozzi da Vignola, the first church of the Italian Renaissance to have an elliptical dome.

Births
 22 March – Catherine de Parthenay, French noblewoman and mathematician (d. 1631)
 November – Jakob Christmann, German orientalist and astronomer (died 1613)
 Probable date
 James Lancaster, English navigator (died 1618)
 Walter Ralegh, English explorer (died 1618)

Deaths
 February 21 – Hieronymus Bock, German botanist (born 1498)
 September 22 – Francisco Vásquez de Coronado, Spanish conquistador (born c. 1510)
 Tan Yunxian, Chinese physician (born 1461)
 unknown date – Sir Hugh Willoughby, English explorer (in the Arctic Sea)

References

 
16th century in science
1550s in science